Bus Australia was an Australian interstate coach operator formed in 1985 when Volvo Trucks dealer Max Winkless from Perth linked Across Australia Coachlines with Briscoe's Coachlines and Quest Tours of Adelaide, and Perth based Parlorcars Group. In 1989 the east coast-based Intertour business was purchased with 27 coaches. In 1993 Bus Australia merged with Greyhound Australia and Ansett Pioneer to form Greyhound Pioneer Australia.

Fleet
While operating the standard Austral Tourmaster and Denning Landseer coaches, in 1986 Bus Australia began importing Bova Futura coaches from the Netherlands. Some were assembled in Perth by JW Bolton. Fleet livery was white, red and blue.

References

Bus companies of Australia
Transport companies established in 1985
Transport companies disestablished in 1993
Australian companies disestablished in 1993
Australian companies established in 1985